Miguel Castroman Aragundi (born 17 March 1995) is a Swiss footballer who currently plays for FC Thun.

Club career

Early career
Castroman started his youth career with hometown club FC Breitenrain Bern. He later moved to BSC Young Boys and came up through the academy there.

Young Boys
Following several seasons with the U16, U18, and U21 teams, Castroman made his senior debut for the club in the 2015/16 season. His top flight debut came on 12 August 2015 in a 1–0 loss to FC Lugano, coming on as a substitute for Alexander David González in the 68th minute. Two weeks later, Castroman made another appearance off the bench in a 3-2 defeat to Grasshopper Zürich. He would make three appearances in November 2015, against Lugano, Sion, and St. Gallen, which would prove to be his final appearances for the club.

Wohlen (loan)
In February 2016, Castroman was loaned out to Swiss Challenge League club FC Wohlen. His league debut for the club came on 21 February 2016 in a 1–0 loss to Chiasso. His first league goal for Wohlen came almost a year later in a 2–1 loss to Winterthur on 20 February 2017. His goal came in the 38th minute.

Schaffhausen (loan)
Following the expiry of his first loan in June 2017, Castroman was loaned out again, this time to FC Schaffhausen. He made an immediate impact with his new club, scoring twice on his debut, a 6–0 victory over Rapperswil-Jona. His goals came in the 18th and 57th minutes. On 19 July 2018, Castroman's loan with Schaffhausen was extended for another season.

Thun
In March 2019, Castroman signed a three-year deal with FC Thun ahead of the 2019/20 season. He made his league debut for the club on 20 July 2019 in a 2-2 home draw with Neuchâtel Xamax. In August 2020, Castroman suffered a ruptured cruciate ligament and torn meniscus, sidelining him for upwards of nine months.

Personal life
Born in Switzerland, Castroman is of Spanish descent.

Honors

Club
BSC Young Boys
Swiss Super League Runner-Up: 2014–15

FC Schaffhausen
Swiss Challenge League Runner-Up: 2017–18

References

External links
 

1995 births
Living people
Swiss men's footballers
Switzerland youth international footballers
Swiss people of Spanish descent
BSC Young Boys players
FC Wohlen players
FC Schaffhausen players
FC Thun players
Swiss Super League players
Swiss Challenge League players
Association football midfielders
Footballers from Bern